Portland Union Station is a train station in Portland, Oregon, United States, situated near the western shore of the Willamette River in Old Town Chinatown. It serves as an intermediate stop for Amtrak's Cascades and Coast Starlight routes and, along with King Street Station in Seattle, is one of two western termini of the Empire Builder. The station is a major transport hub for the Portland metropolitan area with connections to MAX Light Rail, the Portland Streetcar, and local and intercity bus services. The station building contains Wilf's Restaurant & Bar on the ground level and offices on the upper floors. It also has Amtrak's first Metropolitan Lounge on the West Coast, which is reserved for first-class sleeping car and business-class passengers.

Southeast of the station, the tracks make a sharp turn and cross the river on the historic Steel Bridge. To the northwest, they follow the river, passing through rail yards before crossing the river again on the Burlington Northern Railroad Bridge 5.1.

The station is owned by the city of Portland and operated by Prosper Portland, the city's urban renewal agency. The city earns $200,000 a year from nearly 30 tenants.  Amtrak, the main tenant, has a continuing lease in 2021.

Services

Union Station serves as a major intermodal transportation hub for Portland and Oregon. Union Station connects to TriMet MAX Green and Yellow Line trains at the nearby Union Station/Northwest 6th & Hoyt Street and Union Station/Northwest 5th & Glisan Street stations, as well as local bus service provided by TriMet. Located at the northern end of TriMet's transit mall, Union Station is also only a short walk to both lines of the Portland Streetcar, in the Pearl District.

The station is one of two western termini for the Empire Builder, Amtrak's major long-distance train to the Pacific Northwest. The train splits at Spokane, with one section continuing to Portland by way of the Columbia River Gorge and the other continuing to Seattle. It is also a stop for the Seattle-Los Angeles Coast Starlight, Amtrak's long-distance West Coast train. It serves as the southern terminus for two daily Cascades trains from Vancouver, British Columbia and four daily Cascades trains from Seattle, and the northern terminus for two Cascades trains from Eugene.

As of 2018, Union Station is the fifth-busiest Amtrak station in the Western United States (behind Los Angeles, Sacramento, Seattle and Emeryville) and the 21st busiest overall.

Bus connections
Portland's former Greyhound bus terminal is the next building to the south, having moved to the building (from a location in the center of downtown) in 1985. Greyhound vacated the facility in September 2019 in favor of a curbside pickup location nearby.

Station details

Union station is situated near the western bank of the Willamette River in downtown Portland's Old Town Chinatown. The site is bound by Northwest Glisan, Hoyt, and Irving streets to the south; Northwest Broadway Street and Station Way to the west; Northwest Overton Street and Naito Parkway to the north; and Northwest Ironside Terrace and industrial and commercial zones to the east.

History

The initial design for the station was created in 1882 by McKim, Mead & White. Had the original plan been built, the station would have been the largest train station in the world. A smaller plan was introduced by architects Van Brunt & Howe, and accepted in 1885. Construction of the station began in 1890. It was built by Northern Pacific Terminal Company at a cost of $300,000 ($ in  adjusted for inflation), and opened on February 14, 1896. The signature piece of the structure is the 150-foot-tall Romanesque Revival clock tower. Neon signs were added to the tower in 1948. The signs read "Go by Train" on the northeast and southwest sides and "Union Station" on the northwest and southeast sides.

In the years prior to Amtrak's assuming passenger operations on May 1, 1971, the Union Pacific's City of Portland ran to Portland from Chicago via Utah. Amtrak ran a successor train, the Pioneer, on a similar route to Portland until 1997.

The station was placed on the National Register of Historic Places in 1975.

The neon signs on the tower went dark in March 1971, because the railroads using it, Union Pacific, Burlington Northern and Southern Pacific, were preparing to transfer all of their remaining passenger services to Amtrak. For that reason, the station's then-owner, the Portland Terminal Railroad (itself jointly owned by those three railroads), decided to discontinue operation of the signs. In 1985, two local non-profit groups, the National Railway Historical Society (Pacific Northwest chapter) and the Oregon Association of Railway Passengers, led a fundraising campaign for public donations to enable the signs to be restored to operation. New neon tubes, in place of the old, were installed in July, and the signs were switched back on and returned to regular use in September 1985. The "Union Station" signs remain illuminated continuously, while the "Go by Train" signs flash on and off, in a sequence of "Go", then "Go by", then all three words, then off and on and repeat.

In 1987, ownership of the station and surrounding land was transferred from Portland Terminal Railroad to the Portland Development Commission (now Prosper Portland) as part of the Downtown/Waterfront urban-renewal district. Shortly afterwards, Union Station underwent a renovation. It was rededicated in 1996.

In 2004, the roadway in front of the station was reconfigured, providing a new connection to the northwest and a forecourt. In addition, the area is being redeveloped, including new housing where railroad tracks once were.

See also
 North Bank Depot – former train station located nearby
 Tourism in Portland, Oregon

References

External links

 "All Aboard!" at Union Station, 1896 Oregonian article on Union Station opening

Amtrak stations in Oregon
Railway stations in Portland, Oregon
Union stations in the United States
Railway stations in the United States opened in 1896
Railway stations on the National Register of Historic Places in Oregon
Clock towers in Oregon
Romanesque Revival architecture in Oregon
Transit centers in the United States
National Register of Historic Places in Portland, Oregon
Former Union Pacific Railroad stations in Oregon
Former Northern Pacific Railway stations
Former Southern Pacific Railroad stations in Oregon
Old Town Chinatown
1896 establishments in Oregon
Northwest Portland, Oregon